Luis María Maidana Silveira (born 22 February 1934 in Piriápolis) is a Uruguayan football goalkeeper who played for Uruguay in the 1962 FIFA World Cup. He also played for C.A. Peñarol.

References

External links
 

1934 births
People from Piriápolis
Uruguayan footballers
Uruguay international footballers
Association football goalkeepers
Uruguayan Primera División players
Peñarol players
1962 FIFA World Cup players
Living people